Michael Broadhurst (born 30 October 1986) is a New Zealand born Japanese rugby union player who plays at flanker, lock or number 8 for the Ricoh Black Rams in the Top League and the Japan national rugby union team.

Broadhurst was educated at Campion College, Gisborne and started his career with Poverty Bay in the Heartland Championship and in 2008 he won selection for the New Zealand Heartland XV as one of the top players in the competition.

In 2009, Broadhurst moved to Japan to play for the Kubota Spears in the Top League who he spent one season with before moving to the Ricoh Black Rams. In 2012 he qualified to play for  through residency, and he played his first matches for them in June in the two matches series against the French Barbarians playing at lock and scored a try in the second match.

In 2013, with Michael Leitch out injured, Broadhurst won starting position in the team at flanker and notably scored tries in both matches of the two test matches against  in June, helping Japan to their first ever victory over the Welsh in the 2nd Test.

Broadhurst returned to the Japan team in 2015 after missing all of 2014 with injury, and started every match in their successful Rugby World Cup campaign. Following that tournament he retired from international rugby to spend more time with his family, but continued playing in Japan for the Ricoh Black Rams and became a Japanese citizen in 2017.

His younger brother James Broadhurst was also a professional rugby player until his retirement in 2017. James is also a former All Black.

References

External links

1986 births
Expatriate rugby union players in Japan
Japanese rugby union players
Japan international rugby union players
Living people
New Zealand expatriate rugby union players
New Zealand expatriate sportspeople in Japan
New Zealand rugby union players
Black Rams Tokyo players
Rugby union flankers
Rugby union number eights
Rugby union players from Gisborne, New Zealand
People educated at Campion College, Gisborne